The 51115/51116 Chalisgaon Dhule Passenger is an Indian passenger train service in the state of Maharashtra, operated by Indian Railways. It runs from Chalisgaon Junction to Dhule Terminus.

It operates as train number 51115 from Chalisgaon Junction to Dhule Terminus and as train number 51116 in the reverse direction.

Service
Chalisgaon Dhule Passenger has a total of 7 stops between Chalisgaon Junction to Dhule Terminus and covers a distance of 56 km. in 1 hour and 15 minutes. It is operated by the Bhusawal division of Central Railway.

Routeing

The 51115/16 Chalisgaon Dhule  Passenger runs via Bhoras Budruk, Jamda, Rajmane, Mordad Tanda, Shirud, Mohadi Pargane Laling, to Dhule Terminus.

See also
Indian Railways

External links
Devlalai - Bhusawal Passenger Time-Table
 Ministry of Indian Railways, Official website
 Indian Railways Live Information, Official website
Book Indian Railway Tickets
Station Code official list.
Indian Railways Station List.
Indian Railway Station Codes 
Train Running Status
Indian Railway Map, Official website

Slow and fast passenger trains in India
Rail transport in Maharashtra